KTLS-FM is a radio station airing a classic rock format licensed to Holdenville, Oklahoma, broadcasting on 106.5 MHz FM.  The station serves the areas of Ada, Oklahoma, and Holdenville, Oklahoma, and is owned by The Chickasaw Nation.

References

External links
KTLS-FM's official website

Classic rock radio stations in the United States
TLS-FM